Thelyoxynops is a genus of flies in the family Tachinidae.

Species
Thelyoxynops antennalis (Thompson, 1968)
Thelyoxynops nitens (Townsend, 1927)
Thelyoxynops orbitalis Townsend, 1927

References

Diptera of North America
Exoristinae
Tachinidae genera
Taxa named by Charles Henry Tyler Townsend